The discography of British singer Tom Chaplin consists of three studio albums and ten singles.

Chaplin released his debut studio album The Wave on 14 October 2016. Four tracks from the album were released as singles: "Quicksand", "Still Waiting", "Solid Gold" and "See It So Clear".

The second studio album, Twelve Tales of Christmas, was released on 17 November 2017, with four singles being released: "Under a Million Lights", "2000 Miles", "River" and "Midnight Mass".

Albums

Studio albums

Singles

Music videos

References

Chaplin, Tom